The  submarines were double-hulled medium-sized submarines of the Imperial Japanese Navy during World War II.

Several variants existed. From 1934 to 1944, the K6 type (Ro-33 Class) and the K7 type (Senchū, Ro-35 Class) were built. They were equipped with a  L/40 gun and four 53 cm torpedo tubes for ten type 95 Long Lance torpedoes.

Most of these submarines were destroyed in combat, suffering from Allied anti-submarine warfare measures, and only  survived the war.

Class variants
The Kaichū type submarines were divided into seven classes:

Kaichū I (Ro-11 class)

Project number S7. In 1910s, the Imperial Japanese Navy (IJN) bought a license of Schneider-Laubeuf design submarine. The Kaichū I is the submarine which jumboized the S Type submarines.
Boats in class

Kaichū II (Ro-13 class)

Project number S18. The Kaichū II had an increased range compared with the Kaichū I, and the turning torpedo tubes were removed.
Boats in class

Kaichū III (Ro-16 class)

Project number S18. Their project number was the same as in the Kaichū II type submarine, however their performance was improved.

Boats in class

Kaichū IV (Ro-26 class)

Project number S18A. Improved model from the Kaichū III type. 
Boats in class

Kaichū V (Toku-Chū, Ro-29 class)

Project number S18B. They were built for the commerce raiding role.
Boats in class

Kaichū VI (Ro-33 class)

Project number S30. They were planned as a prototype for a mass production submarines in the wartime under the Maru 1 Programme.
Boats in class

Kaichū VII (Sen-Chū, Ro-35 class)

Project number S44. The final design in the Kaichū series. They were equipped with a Freon air-conditioner, because the IJN took into consideration that they were to be active on the equator area too.
The IJN planned to build these boats under the following Naval Armaments Supplement Programmes:
 9 boats in the Maru Rin Programme (Boat # 201 - 209)
 12 boats in the Maru Kyū Programme (Boat # 385 - 396)
 15 boats in the Maru Tui Programme (Boat # 640 - 654)
 43 boats in the Kai-Maru 5 Programme (Boat # 5181 - 5223)

However some of the boats were cancelled and their naval budgets, materials and staffs were transferred to the I-201 class submarines.

Boats in class

Characteristics

Bibliography
, History of Pacific War Vol.17 I-Gō Submarines, Gakken (Japan), January 1998, 
Rekishi Gunzō, History of Pacific War Extra, "Perfect guide, The submarines of the Imperial Japanese Forces", Gakken (Japan), March 2005, 
The Maru Special, Japanese Naval Vessels No.43 Japanese Submarines III, Ushio Shobō (Japan), September 1980, Book code 68343-44
The Maru Special, Japanese Naval Vessels No.132 Japanese Submarines I "Revised edition", Ushio Shobō (Japan), February 1988, Book code 68344-36
The Maru Special, Japanese Naval Vessels No.133 Japanese Submarines II "Revised edition", Ushio Shobō (Japan), March 1988, Book code 68344-37
The Maru Special, Japanese Naval Vessels No.135 Japanese Submarines IV, Ushio Shobō (Japan), May 1988, Book code 68344-39

References

Submarine classes
 
Submarines of the Imperial Japanese Navy